Hypercalculia is "a specific developmental condition in which the ability to perform mathematical calculations is significantly superior to general learning ability and to school attainment in maths." A 2002 neuroimaging study of a child with hypercalculia suggested greater brain volume in the right temporal lobe. Serial SPECT scans revealed hyperperfusion over right parietal areas during performance of arithmetic tasks.

Math and reading achievement profiles in autistic individuals
Children at any age may be stronger in language or in mathematics, but very rarely in both. Autistic children are no different. A rare example of a child with multiple savant tendencies is a case study of a thirteen year old girl. Pacheva, Panoy, Gillberg, and Neville discovered this young woman has not only hypercalculia abilities, but also showcases hyperlexia, and hypermnesia capabilities.

A study published in 2014 examined the reading and math achievement profiles and their changes over time within a sample of children between the ages 6–9 diagnosed with an autism spectrum disorder. What they found was that there are four distinct achievement profiles: higher-achieving (39%), hyperlexia (9%), hypercalculia (20%) and lower-achieving (32%). A previous study conducted in 2009 estimated the rate of hypercalculia at 16.2% in ASD adolescents.

According to Wei, Christiano, Yu, Wagner, and Spiker, research of the ASD achievement profile, hypercalculia, is sometimes overlooked in academic settings. Sometimes this oversight is a result of more resources being spent on understanding the capabilities of children who exhibit hyperlexia. Children with an ASD have shown various results during testing for hypercalulia. Some of these varied results indicate: below average performance of mathematical and problem solving tasks, average proficiency, and high-achievers topping the 99th percentile on 'standardized math achievement measures.'

There is an ongoing debate concerning the cause of hypercalculia along with other savant perceptions. Some researchers theorize that obsessive tendencies may trigger greater attention to certain areas of their lives.

Individuals with autism will sometimes focus a lot of their time, energy, and attention on schedules or routines, calendar calculations, numbers or counting, and/or music.

Other researchers speculate that people with savant tendencies may use different brain areas while they are processing subjects of their higher abilities. Among other debate arguments are hypotheses with regards to neural processes and working memory storage capabilities.

Wallace sometimes refers to these individuals as "mathematical savants" or "arithmetic savants." In his experience, individuals with this ability tend to prefer a chunking or segmentation method of sorts. Their proclivities tend to push them towards breaking bigger things down to smaller things like numbers or equations. This data led Wallace to research, "prime number savants." Prime number savants can calculate which numbers are prime by breaking up the number over and over numerous times until they are at its lowest form. The next step is figuring out if that number can be evenly divided.

Behavioral research of children with higher-achieving intellectual abilities 
There are five different types of disorders that have been labeled on the autistic disorder spectrum. According to the Diagnostic and Statistical Manual of Mental Disorders, Fourth Edition (DSM-IV), the five different types of disorders on the autism spectrum are listed as: Autistic disorder, Asperger disorder, childhood disintegrative disorder, Rett disorder, and pervasive developmental disorder - not otherwise specified (PPD-NOS).

In a 2013 study, the behavior of children on the autism spectrum who exhibited intellectual abilities was observed. The behavior of these children was compared to children of normal intellectual status. Research shows that these children tended to internalize their problems. Further investigation proffers the suggestion that this internalization is due to social and language impairments. Many children on the autism spectrum with different savant perceptions such as hypercalculia, hyperlexia, and semantic hypermnesia tended to internalize their problems. These children were more likely to experience anxiety, low self-esteem, perfectionism and struggles in their social life. These social issues stem from withdrawal in social circumstances and an unwillingness to share. A lot of these children that were observed fell into two types of disorders on the spectrum, PPD and Asperger disorder. The results show that there is little difference in the behavior of children considered to be high-achieving in their intellectual abilities and those children not as intellectually gifted.

Education of children with savant abilities 
Towards the end of the twentieth century, recognition of autistic children, including autistic children with savant abilities, has increased awareness in the educational system.

There are just a few main names for savant children. The first category of savants was first discovered in London in 1887 by Dr. J. Langdon Down. Down coined the term 'idiot savant.' This term is given to individuals who have an IQ score below 25. These individuals show below average intelligence in most areas, but still show gifted expertise among such areas as music, arithmetic, reading, writing, or art to name a few. Idiot savant is no longer an acceptable name of categorization. It is not used very much anymore and was mainly discontinued after the first century of its discovery. Almost all individuals diagnosed with savant aptitudes test with an IQ of 40 or above.

The second name often used for these children is 'autistic savant.' Just like Down's term, autistic savant is not always appropriate for all savant cases. Only half of individuals with savant syndrome are autistic. The other half of the savant population suffer from other central nervous system deficiencies caused by injuries or other disorders.

Savant syndrome is the more overarching and accurate name to identify children with these higher-cognition skills.

Awareness of savant syndrome has increased, but the limited number of affected individuals has complicated finding educational resources to meet their needs. Better diagnostic tools over the years has helped identify these children and their needs. For the benefit of the students, educators should keep in mind that although these children are skilled in certain areas and may even take courses for the gifted, they may come across as rude and perhaps disrespectful. These behaviors might be shown to fellow classmates and teachers because these students will not always be adept at communication and social cues.

Other concepts to consider in the educational system are the child's weaknesses and strengths. These will be unique to each child. In some examples of children with mathematical savant talents, individual children can be exhibit human calculator abilities, but be unable to use those skills in every day functions. There is sometimes a disconnection between their savant abilities and practical situations.

Hypercalculia training in individuals unaffected by autism 
Hypercalculia might not always be just for those with savant abilities. Using reverse artificial intelligence, theorists suggest a way to emulate computers in mathematical computations.

See also
 Acalculia
 Dyscalculia
 Mental calculator
 Numerical cognition
 Savant syndrome

References

Further reading
 

Cognitive psychology
Cognitive neuroscience
Developmental neuroscience
Developmental psychology
Autism
Spectrum disorders
Symptoms and signs: Nervous system